Meylin Patricia Morales Galán (born 12 April 1986), known as Meyling Morales, is a Nicaraguan footballer who plays as a midfielder. She has been a member of the Nicaragua women's national team.

Club career
Morales has played for Diriangén FC in Nicaragua.

International career
Morales capped for Nicaragua at senior level during the 2010 CONCACAF Women's World Cup Qualifying qualification, the 2010 Central American and Caribbean Games and the 2012 CONCACAF Women's Olympic Qualifying Tournament qualification.

References 

1986 births
Living people
Nicaraguan women's footballers
Women's association football midfielders
Diriangén FC players
Nicaragua women's international footballers